Robert "Bob" Dupuis (October 15, 1935 – June 3, 2020) was an American ice hockey defenseman who was an All-American for Boston University.

Career
After graduating from Lynn Classical Dupuis began attending Boston University in 1954. He joined the varsity squad the following year and helped the team improve to 11–11. As a junior Dupuis led the Terriers in scoring with 6 goals and 25 points while the team posted its first winning season in four years. He was named team co-captain in his senior season and teamed with Don MacLeod on the blueline to form one of the toughest defensive tandems in the nation. Both players were named as AHCA East All-American while helping BU to finish with a 17–5–1 record. Despite the Terriers having the best record amongst eastern independents, the NCAA selection committee offered the 1958 NCAA Tournament bid to Harvard instead.

After graduating, Dupuis joined the US national team and played for the team during the following season. He appeared in one game during the 1959 World Championships while the team finished in 4th place. Some sources credit Dupuis with 2 assists during the 1960 Winter Olympics but no record exists of his being a member of that team. 

Dupuis was inducted into the Boston University Athletic Hall of Fame in 1983.

Statistics

Regular season and playoffs

Awards and honors

References

External links

1935 births
2020 deaths
American men's ice hockey defensemen
Boston University Terriers men's ice hockey players
Ice hockey players from Massachusetts
People from Lynn, Massachusetts
AHCA Division I men's ice hockey All-Americans